Fiona Brown may refer to:

 Fiona Brown (bridge) (born 1985), Bridge player
 Fiona Brown (footballer) (born 1995), Scottish footballer
 Fiona Brown (golfer) (born 1974), English amateur golfer
 Fiz Brown, a fictional character in the television soap opera Coronation Street